Rosignano Marittimo is a comune (municipality) in the Province of Livorno in the Italian region Tuscany, located about  southwest of Florence and about  southeast of Livorno.

Geography
Rosignano Marittimo borders the following municipalities: Castellina Marittima, Cecina, Collesalvetti, Livorno, Orciano Pisano, Santa Luce.

Government
 Frazioni 
The comune is formed by the municipal seat of Rosignano Marittimo and the frazioni – towns and villages – of Castelnuovo della Misericordia, Castiglioncello, Gabbro, Nibbiaia, Rosignano Solvay and Vada. The resort town of La Mazzanta is also included in the municipality.

History
World War II
During World War II a major United States Army Air Force base was located near Rosignano, controlled by the Twelfth Air Force. After the war the airfield was closed and the land returned to agricultural use. Today there is little or no evidence of its existence.

International relations 

Rosignano Marittimo is twinned with:

 Champigny-sur-Marne, France.
 Musselburgh, United Kingdom
 Zug, Western Sahara

See also
 Vada Shoal Lighthouse

References

External links
 Comune di Rosignano Maritimo

Cities and towns in Tuscany